Squash at the 2010 Commonwealth Games was held at the Siri Fort Sports Complex from 4 to 13 October 2010. The training venue for the participants was Siri Fort Sports Complex – 3. Every CGA has been allowed to send a maximum of 8 players, 4 male and 4 female, for this event.

Medal table

Medallists

Participating nations

References

 
2010 Commonwealth Games events
2010
2010 in squash